Kismet is a hamlet in the town of Islip, Suffolk County, New York, United States. It is the westernmost beach community on Fire Island, immediately west of Saltaire and east of the Fire Island Light. Kismet is accessible by road or on foot via Robert Moses State Park to the west, or by ferry (Fire Island Ferries) from Bay Shore on Long Island.

Facilities in Kismet include a marina, a few stores (the Kismet Market, Beach & Vine Wines & Spirits and the Red Wagon Emporium), Margarita Villas LLC Vacation Rentals, and three restaurants, Fire Island Tap (located at Margarita Villas), the Kismet Inn and the Surf's Out.

Education
Residents are zoned to the Fire Island School District. Students attend the Woodhull School (PK-6), and then may choose either Bay Shore School District or Islip School District for secondary education. Their respective high schools are Bay Shore High School and Islip High School.

References

External links
 Official Kismet Community Association Website
Fire Island on Facebook
Fire Island Travel Guide

Fire Island, New York
Islip (town), New York
Hamlets in New York (state)
Beaches of Suffolk County, New York
Hamlets in Suffolk County, New York
Populated coastal places in New York (state)